Ken O'Keefe (born August 18, 1953) is an American football coach and former player. He most recently served as the quarterbacks coach for the Iowa Hawkeyes football team, a position he held from January 2017 through February 2022. O'Keefe served as the offensive coordinator for the Iowa Hawkeyes football team from 1999 to 2011. He was the head football coach at the Allegheny College from 1990 to 1997 and at Fordham University in 1998, compiling a career college football record of 83–17–1. In O'Keefe's first season at Allegheny, in 1990, his team went 13–0–1 and won the NCAA Division III Football Championship.

Coaching career
While coaching at Allegheny College, O'Keefe created an exchange program between Russian and American middle school football players.  In recognition he received the Dodge Award for language advocacy from the Northeast Conference on the Teaching of Foreign Languages in 1998.

On February 3, 2012, O'Keefe resigned from the Iowa program to take a job with the Miami Dolphins of the National Football League (NFL). Former Dolphins head coach Joe Philbin spent several years on Iowa's staff, coaching the offensive line from 1999 to 2002. O'Keefe returned to Iowa prior to the 2017 season as its quarterbacks coach. He stepped down from his role after the 2021 season, taking an off-field role in the program.

Head coaching record

References

External links
 Iowa profile

1953 births
Living people
American football wide receivers
Allegheny Gators football coaches
Fordham Rams football coaches
High school football coaches in Massachusetts
High school football coaches in Texas
Iowa Hawkeyes football coaches
John Carroll Blue Streaks baseball players
John Carroll Blue Streaks football players
Miami Dolphins coaches
New Haven Chargers football coaches
People from Milford, Connecticut
Players of American football from Connecticut